FC Sevastopol was a Ukrainian football club based in Sevastopol. The club was a spiritual descendant of the Soviet clubs from Sevastopol such as Chaika Sevastopol. After the completion of 2013–14 Ukrainian Premier League season due to the 2014 Crimean Conflict, the club ceased its existence and applied for a Russian license with the new name FC SKChF Sevastopol.

In 2016, the UEFA sanctioned Crimean Premier League allowed for FC SKChF Sevastopol to be renamed to FC Sevastopol.

History
The current club was founded in 2002 after another club from Sevastopol Chaika Sevastopol was relegated from professional ranks and dissolved. FC Sevastopol started out from the Ukrainian Second League and soon was promoted to the Ukrainian First League in 2007. In 2010–11 the club took part in the Premier League of Ukraine for the first time. The club was relegated in its first season back in the Ukrainian First League once more. But the club returned to the Ukrainian Premier League after one season there in which they won promotion to the Ukrainian Premier League.
After the annexation of Crimea by Russia, FC Sevastopol asked permission from UEFA and FIFA to shift to the Russian league next season. The new club, FC SKChF Sevastopol, began playing in Russian competitions in August 2014.

The club's colours are all red (home) and all dark blue (away).

Stadium
For the first half of the 2009–10 season the home ground of the club was located outside the Sevastopol city limits. FC Sevastopol played at the Druzhba Stadium located in Bakhchisaray, Crimea. After the winter break they returned to their home ground Sevastopol Sports Complex. There are promises to rebuild the Hirnyk Stadium in Balaklava, which is part of the Sevastopol municipality. The reconstruction of Hirnyk is predicted to take place some time in the future.

Football kits and sponsors

Honors

Ukrainian First League (2nd Tier)
  2009–10, 2012–13
Ukrainian Second League (3rd Tier)
  2006–07 (Gr. B)

League and cup history (Ukraine)
The team competed in Ukrainian competitions as FC Sevastopol.
{|class="wikitable"
|-bgcolor="#efefef"
! Season
! Div.
! Pos.
! Pl.
! W
! D
! L
! GS
! GA
! P
!Domestic Cup
!colspan=2|Europe
!Notes
|-bgcolor="PowderBlue"
|align=center|2002–03
|align=center|3rd Second League Gr. B
|align=center|9/16
|align=center|30
|align=center|12
|align=center|4
|align=center|14
|align=center|31
|align=center|36
|align=center|40
|align=center| finals
|align=center|
|align=center|
|align=center|
|-bgcolor="PowderBlue"
|align=center|2003–04
|align=center|3rd Second League Gr. B
|align=center|10/16
|align=center|30
|align=center|10
|align=center|8
|align=center|12
|align=center|26
|align=center|33
|align=center|38
|align=center| finals
|align=center|
|align=center|
|align=center|
|-bgcolor="PowderBlue"
|align=center|2004–05
|align=center|3rd Second League Gr. B
|align=center|13/14
|align=center|26
|align=center|7
|align=center|4
|align=center|15
|align=center|19
|align=center|34
|align=center|25
|align=center| finals
|align=center|
|align=center|
|align=center|
|-bgcolor="PowderBlue"
|align=center|2005–06
|align=center|3rd Second League Gr. B
|align=center bgcolor=tan|3/15
|align=center|28
|align=center|15
|align=center|6
|align=center|7
|align=center|48
|align=center|29
|align=center|51
|align=center| finals
|align=center|
|align=center|
|align=center|
|-bgcolor="PowderBlue"
|align=center|2006–07
|align=center|3rd Second League Gr. B
|align=center bgcolor=gold|1/16
|align=center|28
|align=center|21
|align=center|1
|align=center|6
|align=center|58
|align=center|21
|align=center|64
|align=center| finals
|align=center|
|align=center|
|align=center bgcolor=lightgreen|Promoted
|-bgcolor=LightCyan
|align=center|2007–08
|align=center|2nd First League
|align=center|15/20
|align=center|38
|align=center|12
|align=center|7
|align=center|19
|align=center|38
|align=center|55
|align=center|43
|align=center| finals
|align=center|
|align=center|
|align=center|
|-bgcolor=LightCyan
|align=center|2008–09
|align=center|2nd First League
|align=center|4/18
|align=center|32
|align=center|15
|align=center|6
|align=center|11
|align=center|43
|align=center|41
|align=center|51
|align=center| finals
|align=center|
|align=center|
|align=center|
|-bgcolor=LightCyan
|align=center|2009–10
|align=center|2nd First League
|align=center bgcolor=gold|1/18
|align=center|34
|align=center|24
|align=center|4
|align=center|6
|align=center|68
|align=center|27
|align=center|76
|align=center| finals
|align=center|
|align=center|
|align=center bgcolor=lightgreen|Promoted
|-
|align=center|2010–11
|align=center|1st Premier League
|align=center|15/16
|align=center|30
|align=center|7
|align=center|6
|align=center|17
|align=center|26
|align=center|48
|align=center|27
|align=center| finals
|align=center|
|align=center|
|align=center bgcolor=pink|Relegated
|-bgcolor=LightCyan
|align=center|2011–12
|align=center|2nd First League
|align=center bgcolor=tan|3/18
|align=center|34
|align=center|23
|align=center|7
|align=center|4
|align=center|60
|align=center|22
|align=center|76
|align=center| finals
|align=center|
|align=center|
|align=center|
|-bgcolor=LightCyan
|align=center|2012–13
|align=center|2nd First League
|align=center bgcolor=gold|1/18
|align=center|34
|align=center|22
|align=center|8
|align=center|4
|align=center|71
|align=center|22
|align=center|74
|align=center bgcolor=tan| finals
|align=center|
|align=center|
|align=center bgcolor=lightgreen|Promoted
|-
|align=center|2013–14
|align=center|1st Premier League
|align=center|9/16
|align=center|28
|align=center|10
|align=center|5
|align=center|13
|align=center|32
|align=center|43
|align=center|35
|align=center| finals
|align=center|
|align=center|
|align=center bgcolor=Pink|Expelled

|}

Coaches
 Valeriy Petrov (July 2002 – 2005)
 Serhiy Puchkov (1 July 2005 – Sept 29, 2008)
 Oleh Leschynskyi (Sept 29, 2008–19 June 2010)
 Serhiy Shevchenko (1 July 2010 – Sept 12, 2010)
 Oleh Leschynskyi (interim) (Sept 12, 2010–2 Dec 2010)
 Angel Chervenkov (21 Dec 2010 – 14 June 2011)
 Oleksandr Ryabokon (28 June 2011 – 17 Oct 2011)
 Serhiy Puchkov (18 Oct 2011 – 13 June 2012)
 Aleh Konanaw (13 June 2012 – 10 Aug 2013)
 Hennadiy Orbu (interim) (10 Aug 2013 – 27 Nov 2013)
 Serhiy Konovalov (interim) (27 Nov 2013 – 14 Jan 2014)
 Angel Chervenkov (14 Jan 2014 – 14 June 2014)

References

External links

Official website

 
Sevastopol
Association football clubs established in 2002
Association football clubs disestablished in 2014
2002 establishments in Ukraine
2014 disestablishments in Ukraine